Mitchell Miller may refer to:

Mitchell Miller (ice hockey), American ice hockey defenseman
Mitchell Miller (philosopher), American philosopher
Mitch Miller, American choral conductor